This is a list of African-American newspapers that have been published in the state of Oregon.  It includes both current and historical newspapers.  

Portland is the only city where such newspapers are known to have been published. The first was the Portland New Age, founded as The New Age in 1896.  Notable contemporary newspapers include The Observer and The Skanner.

Newspapers

See also 
List of African-American newspapers and media outlets
List of African-American newspapers in California
List of African-American newspapers in Nevada
List of African-American newspapers in Washington (state)
List of newspapers in Oregon

Works cited

References 

Newspapers
Oregon
African-American
African-American newspapers